Lauderdale County is a county located in the northwestern corner of the U.S. state of Alabama. At the 2020 census the population was 93,564. Its county seat is Florence. Its name is in honor of Colonel James Lauderdale, of Tennessee. Lauderdale is part of the Florence-Muscle Shoals, AL Metropolitan Statistical Area, also known as "The Shoals".

History
Lauderdale County was named in honor of Col. James Lauderdale who was born in Virginia in about 1780. In the early 19th century, Lauderdale, who moved to West Tennessee, became a major in General John Coffee's cavalry of volunteers. Later promoted to lieutenant colonel, he commanded a brigade of mounted riflemen, serving under Andrew Jackson. According to reliable historians, Col. Lauderdale did not die in the Battle of New Orleans, but was wounded in the Battle of Talladega and died on December 23, 1814, seventeen days before Jackson's decisive defeat of the British at New Orleans. Several towns and counties in the southern states were named in his honor, though it is said that he never set foot in Lauderdale County.

Lauderdale County was established in 1818, a year before Alabama became a state. Florence, the county seat of Lauderdale County, was also established in 1818. At this time a group of investors, under the name of Cypress Land Company purchased from the government  of land consisting of the original town site. Other towns in Lauderdale County competing for early settlers because of their proximity to the river were Savage's Spring, nine miles (14 km) below Florence and Waterloo, some  downriver.

Among the older settlements in the county is Center Star, located between Killen and Rogersville. This area was once claimed by both the Chickasaws and Cherokees, necessitating a cession of territory from each tribe before the settlement could be established. At one time, the remains of an old Indian village could be seen southwest of Center Star. Other old settlements included Middleton and Elgin, the latter known first as Ingram's Elgin Cross Roads.

The late Will Rogers is said to have been a descendant of this same family. An early ferry that operated for many years was Lamb's Ferry near Rogersville.

Lexington, Springfield, and Anderson lie to the north of the Lee Highway, the town of Lexington being a part of the territory once claimed by the Cherokee.  Many of the settlers of that area came from Tennessee and the Carolinas. The first post office of record at Lexington was on the Loretto Road, north of town, in 1880.  Mail at that time was brought in from Loretto, Tennessee, by horseback and carts.

The town of St. Florian was established in 1872 on the Jackson Highway and named by its Catholic founders (of German descent) for their patron saint.

Four Alabama governors were from the county - Hugh McVay, Robert M. Patton, Edward A. O'Neal and Emmett O'Neal.

Geography

National protected areas
 Key Cave National Wildlife Refuge
 Natchez Trace Parkway (part)

Rivers
Tennessee River
Elk River

Adjacent counties
Wayne County, Tennessee - north
Lawrence County, Tennessee - north
Giles County, Tennessee - northeast
Limestone County - east
Lawrence County - southeast
Colbert County - south
Tishomingo County, Mississippi - west
Hardin County, Tennessee - northwest

Demographics

2020

As of the 2020 United States census, there were 93,564 people, 38,761 households, and 23,883 families residing in the county.

2010
According to the 2010 United States census, resident were:
86.4% White
10.0% Black
0.4% Native American
0.7% Asian
0.0% Native Hawaiian or Pacific Islander
1.4% Two or more races
2.2% Hispanic or Latino (of any race)

2000
At the 2000 census, there were 87,966 people, 36,088 households and 25,153 families residing in the county. The racial make-up was 84.38% White or European American, 13.85% Black or African American, 0.25% Native American, 0.35% Asian, 0.02% Pacific Islander, 0.36% from other races and 0.79% from two or more races. 1.02% of the population were Hispanic or Latino of any race.

In 2005, 87.8% of the county population was non-Hispanic whites. African Americans were 11.7% of the population and Latinos 1.2% of the population.

According to the 2000 census, the largest ancestry groups in Lauderdale County were English 41.9%, African 13.85%, Scots-Irish 9.66%, Scottish 4.11%, Irish 3.19% and Welsh 2.5%

In 2000, there were 36,088 households, of which 30.40% had children under the age of 18 living with them, 55.80% were married couples living together, 10.80% had a female householder with no husband present, and 30.30% were non-families. 26.40% of all households were made up of individuals, and 11.00% had someone living alone who was 65 years of age or older. The average household size was 2.39 and the average family size was 2.89.

23.00% of the population were under the age of 18, 10.10% from 18 to 24, 27.90% from 25 to 44, 23.90% from 45 to 64 and 15.10% were 65 years of age or older. The median age was 38 years. For every 100 females, there were 91.70 males.  For every 100 females age 18 and over, there were 88.20 males.

The median household income was $33,354 and the median family income was $41,438. Males had a median income of $33,943 and females $20,804. The per capita income was $18,626. About 10.50% of families and 14.40% of the population were below the poverty line, including 18.50% of those under age 18 and 11.30% of those age 65 or over.

Transportation

Major highways
 U.S. Highway 43
 U.S. Highway 72
 State Route 17
 State Route 20
 State Route 64
 State Route 101
 State Route 133
 State Route 157
 State Route 207

Rail
Tennessee Southern Railroad

Points of interest

Lauderdale County is the location of the W. C. Handy Home and Museum and the Rosenbaum House.

Recreation
 Joe Wheeler State Park
 North Alabama Birding Trail - collection of birdwatching areas.
 Natchez Trace Parkway -   of linear park and roadway that travel from Nashville, Tennessee to Natchez, Mississippi.  It has road pull-offs with educational kiosks with information about the land, history, and native species.
 Shoal Creek Preserve Tract - a  tract for the preservation of native plants and animals. This tract is located north of St. Florian, Alabama.

Government
Lauderdale County is reliably Republican at the presidential level. The last Democrat to win the county in a presidential election is Bill Clinton, who won it by a plurality in 1992.

Education
Lauderdale County School District serves areas outside of Florence, while Florence City Schools serve people in Florence itself.

Communities

City
 Florence (county seat)

Towns
 Anderson
 Killen
 Lexington
 Rogersville
 St. Florian
 Waterloo

Census-designated place
 Underwood-Petersville

Unincorporated communities

 Bailey Springs
 Center Star
 Cloverdale
 Elgin
 Grassy
 Green Hill
 Mars Hill
 Oakland
 Rhodesville
 Smithsonia
 Stewartville
 Threet
 Wright
 Zip City

See also
National Register of Historic Places listings in Lauderdale County, Alabama
Properties on the Alabama Register of Landmarks and Heritage in Lauderdale County, Alabama

References

Further reading

External links

Lauderdale County Government 

 
Florence–Muscle Shoals metropolitan area
1818 establishments in Alabama Territory
Populated places established in 1818
Counties of Appalachia